Zhosaly is a mountain in Karaganda Region, Kazakhstan.

The Zhosaly Sanatorium is located on the northwestern side of the mountain.

Geography 
Zhosaly rises at the southwestern end of the Ayr Mountains, part of the Kazakh Uplands. With an elevation , it is the highest summit of the range.

See also
Geography of Kazakhstan

References

External links
 Санаторий Жосалы -Visit Kazakhstan

Kazakh Uplands
Mountains of Kazakhstan

kk:Жосалы (тау, Қарағанды облысы)